Guyana competed at the 1980 Summer Olympics in Moscow, USSR. They won their first, and only Olympic medal to date during these games. Eight competitors, seven men and one woman, took part in ten events in three sports.

Medalists

Athletics

Men's 100 metres
James Gilkes
 Heat — 10.34
 Quarterfinals — 10.26
 Semifinals — 10.44 (→ did not advance)

Women's 100 metres
 Jennifer Inniss
 Heat — 11.79 (→ did not advance)

Women's Long Jump
 Jennifer Inniss
 Qualification — 6.44 m
 Final — 6.10 m (→ 13th place)

Boxing

Men's Bantamweight (54 kg)
 Michael Anthony → Bronze Medal
 First Round — Bye
 Second Round — Defeated Nureni Gbadamosi (Nigeria) on points (5-0)
 Third Round — Defeated Fayez Zaghloul (Syria) on points (3-2)
 Quarter Finals — Defeated Daniel Zaragoza (Mexico) after referee stopped contest in second round
 Semi Finals — Lost to Juan Hernández (Cuba) on points (0-5)

Men's Featherweight (57 kg)
 Fitzroy Brown
 First Round — Bye
 Second Round — Defeated Abilio Almeida Cabral (Angola) on points (5-0)
 Third Round — Lost to Luis Pizarro (Puerto Rico) on points (0-5)

Men's Light-Welterweight (63,5 kg)
 Barrington Cambridge
 First Round — Lost to Boualem Bel Alouane (Algeria) on points (0-5)

Cycling

Two cyclists represented Guyana in 1980.

Sprint
 James Joseph

1000m time trial
 Errol McLean

References

External links
Official Olympic Reports
International Olympic Committee results database

Nations at the 1980 Summer Olympics
1980 Summer Olympics
1980 in Guyanese sport